Don or Donald Thompson or Thomson may refer to:

Entertainment
 Don Thompson (musician) (born 1940), Canadian jazz musician
 Don Thompson (producer, playwright) (born 1956), American producer, playwright and filmmaker
 Don Thompson (writer) (1935–1994), American comic book historian
 Donald W. Thompson (1937–2019), American filmmaker, producer and screenwriter

Sports
 Don Thompson (offensive lineman) (1902–1968), American player
 Don Thompson (defensive end) (born 1939), American football player
 Don Thompson (baseball) (1923–2009), American player
 Don Thompson (racewalker) (1933–2006), British Olympic race walker
 Don Thomson (born 1941), American barefoot water skiing pioneer
 Don Thomson Jr. (born 1962), Canadian racing car driver
 Donald Thompson (fencer) (1928–2013), American Olympic fencer
 Don Thompson (Australian footballer) (born 1937), Australian rules footballer
 Don Thompson (ice hockey) (born 1949), Canadian ice hockey forward

Others
 Don Thompson (executive) (born 1963), CEO at McDonald's
 Donald Thomson (1901–1970), Australian anthropologist and ornithologist
 Donald Thompson (politician) (1931–2005), English Conservative Party politician
 Donald C. Thompson (admiral) (born 1930), United States Coast Guard admiral
 Donald C. Thompson (photographer) (1884–1947), American war photographer

Other uses
 Don Thompson Award, given for achievement in comic books, comic strips, and animation

See also
 Thompson Donald (1876–1957), Northern Irish politician